"Too Good to Stop Now" is a song written by Bob McDill and Rory Bourke, and recorded by American country music artist Mickey Gilley.  It was released in August 1984 as the first single and title track from his album Too Good to Stop Now.   The song reached #4 on the Billboard Hot Country Singles chart in December 1984 and #1 on the RPM Country Tracks chart in Canada.

Chart performance

Other versions
 John Schneider recorded this song on his 1984 album of the same name.

References

1984 singles
John Schneider (screen actor) songs
Mickey Gilley songs
Songs written by Bob McDill
Songs written by Rory Bourke
Song recordings produced by John Boylan (record producer)
Epic Records singles
1984 songs